Mollymook Beach is a suburb in the City of Shoalhaven, New South Wales, Australia. It is located about four km north of Ulladalla on the northern end of Mollymook beach on the shore of the Tasman Sea. It is a mostly residential area incorporating Bannister Headland and is located north of Mollymook, with the eastern part of the border formed by Blackwater Creek. The southern part of the beach lies in Mollymook.

References

City of Shoalhaven
Towns in the South Coast (New South Wales)
Coastal towns in New South Wales